William "Poss" Watson (25 August 1868 – 17 August 1950) was an Australian rules footballer who played with Essendon in the Victorian Football Association (VFA) and Fremantle in the West Australian Football Association.

Originally from Warrnambool, Watson played alongside Albert Thurgood in Essendon's four consecutive VFA premierships between 1891 and 1894, before getting married and moving to Western Australia (with Thurgood) to play for Fremantle, captaining the team and winning three more premierships in the next four years. He retired at the end of the 1898 season, but returned in 1899 to captain the newly formed Perth Football Club when they were admitted to the league mid-season.

Notes

External links 
		

1868 births
1950 deaths
Australian rules footballers from Victoria (Australia)
Essendon Football Club (VFA) players
Fremantle Football Club (1881–1899) players
Perth Football Club players